Christian Tuipulotu (born 18 February 2001) is a Tonga international rugby league footballer who plays as a  for the Manly Warringah Sea Eagles in the NRL (National Rugby League).

He previously played for the Sydney Roosters in the NRL.

Background
Tuipulotu was born in Auckland, New Zealand, and is of Tongan descent. He is also an alumnus of St Paul's College, Auckland.

Career

2020
Tuipulotu made his first grade debut in round 14 of the 2020 NRL season for the Sydney Roosters against Melbourne at the Sydney Cricket Ground, scoring a try on debut.

On 27 October, he signed with  Manly-Warringah.

2021
He made only one first grade appearance for Manly in the 2021 NRL season and did not feature in the clubs finals campaign.  In round 15 of the 2022 NRL season, he scored two tries in Manly's 28-26 loss against North Queensland.

2022
Tuipulotu was one of seven players involved in the Manly pride jersey player boycott.
He played a total of 19 games in the 2022 NRL season scoring 11 tries.  Manly would finish 11th on the table and miss out on the finals.

References

External links
Manly Sea Eagles profile
Sydney Roosters profile

2000 births
Living people
New Zealand sportspeople of Tongan descent
New Zealand rugby league players
Rugby league players from Auckland
Rugby league wingers
Sydney Roosters players
Manly Warringah Sea Eagles players
Tonga national rugby league team players
People educated at St Paul's College, Auckland